Prionocyphon is a genus of marsh beetles in the family Scirtidae. There are at least 20 described species in Prionocyphon.

Species
These 20 species belong to the genus Prionocyphon:

 Orientoprionocyphon herthae Klausnitzer, 2009
 Orientoprionocyphon rutai Klausnitzer, 2009
 Orientoprionocyphon yoshitomii Klausnitzer, 2009
 Prionocyphon anticetestaceus Klausnitzer, 1976
 Prionocyphon costipennis Ruta, 2010
 Prionocyphon discoideus (Say, 1825)
 Prionocyphon fuscipennis Kiesenwetter, 1874
 Prionocyphon hemisphaerius Klausnitzer, 2013
 Prionocyphon laosensis Yoshitomi & Satô, 2003
 Prionocyphon limbatus LeConte, 1866
 Prionocyphon macrodascilloides Ruta, 2010
 Prionocyphon minusculus Klausnitzer, 1980
 Prionocyphon monteithi Watts, 2010
 Prionocyphon ornatus Abeille de Perrin, 1881
 Prionocyphon ovalis Kiesenwetter, 1874
 Prionocyphon ruthsteuerae Klausnitzer, 2009
 Prionocyphon serricornis (Müller, 1821)
 Prionocyphon sexmaculatus Lewis, 1895
 Prionocyphon umbratilis Klausnitzer, 1976
 Prionocyphon weigeli Klausnitzer, 2009

References

Further reading

External links

 

Scirtoidea
Articles created by Qbugbot